Donato Antonio Laxa Pangilinan (born February 10, 1998), professionally known as Donny Pangilinan, is a Filipino actor, model, singer, host and VJ. Pangilinan started his career in 2016 as a VJ in Myx, a Philippine pay TV channel, and made his film debut in the Regal Films production Walwal (2018). He has since starred in a number of Star Cinema productions, most notably in James & Pat & Dave (2020) and He's Into Her (2021).

Early life and education 
Donato Antonio Laxa Pangilinan was born on February 10, 1998, to actress Maricel Laxa and motivational speaker Anthony Pangilinan, the brother of Philippine Senator Francis Pangilinan. He has four siblings. He was named after both his grandfathers; his first given name Donato was derived from his paternal grandfather, while his second given name Antonio came from his maternal grandfather, actor Tony Ferrer, whose birth name was Antonio Laxa. Pangilinan studied at Brent International School for secondary education and, in 2018, was admitted into the University of the Philippines Open University.

In October 2022, he earned his Bachelor of Ministry in Christian Leadership degree from the College for Global Deployment. He had the graduation ceremony together with his sisters, Ella and Hannah, who received their own degrees as well.

Career

2016–2018: Career Beginnings, MYX, and Walwal 
Donny was Started in Koko Krunch commercial along with his mother. Pangilinan's entry into Philippine entertainment began with guest appearances in various ABS-CBN shows in 2016. He also briefly hosted the show ASAP and was a VJ for Myx.

In 2018 Pangilinan made his on-screen debut in the Regal Films production Walwal, directed by Jose Javier Reyes where he was paired with actress Kisses Delavin. In the same year he was signed by Star Magic, in the same batch as Tony Labrusca and Charlie Dizon, as part of Star Magic Circle 2018. Following this, Pangilinan appeared in the ABS-CBN film To Love Some Buddy starring Zanjoe Marudo and Maja Salvador. He, and Delavin was also a supporting cast for Fantastica starring Vice Ganda, Richard Gutierrez and Dingdong Dantes.

2019–2021: James and Pat and Dave, He's Into Her, and DonBelle Loveteam 
In 2019, the split of his onscreen partnership with Kisses Delavin was reported.

In November the same year, it was announced that Pangilinan will be teaming up with Belle Mariano for He's Into Her, an iWantTFC original series directed by Chad Vidanes that is based on the 2013 Wattpad novel of the same name by Maxine Lat(Maxinejiji). Following this, he made an appearance in the film The Mall, The Merrier directed by Barry Gonzales, starring Vice Ganda and Anne Curtis.

In 2020, Pangilinan had his first lead role in the film James and Pat and Dave, appearing alongside Ronnie Alonte and Loisa Andalio.  In the same year, Pangilinan hosted the Brightlight Productions-produced musical variety show Sunday Noontime Live!, which was aired on TV5 as a blocktimer. The short-lived show was cancelled after three months and Pangilinan subsequently renewed his contract with Star Magic in February 2021.

In 2021, the long-awaited series He's Into Her with his new love team partner Belle Mariano, had its record-breaking launch as it crashed the streaming platform iWant TFC upon its release due to the surge of the number of viewers who wanted to watch the premiere episode. The series was marked a huge success as it continuously trended all-throughout its run, and also helped the iWantTFC app to top all free entertainment apps in the country. It was also the number one most watched series on the streaming platform.

For the series' soundtrack, Pangilinan collaborated with Mariano for a duet version of the latter's hit single Sigurado under Star Music. Aside from this, he also released his own version of the series' OST He's Into Her which was originally sung by BGYO.

Following the series' success, the cast headlined a special online concert, He's Into Her: The Benison Ball for the fans to enjoy through the streaming platform KTX.ph. VIP tickets for the show sold out after only three days since release. At the end of show, it was announced that a second season of the show will take place. Shortly after the successful concert, ABS-CBN Entertainment also unveiled He's Into Her: The Journey, a documentary about the making of the series. It showed the production of the show from the conceptualization, auditions, and the lock-in tapings. With the series' production passing to two years, the documentary also showed the hardship of the entire team and how the managed to push through the show even during a global pandemic and after the ABS-CBN shutdown.

2021–present: Wings, Love Is Color Blind, and Future Projects 
In November 2021, Pangilinan released new single Wings under Universal Records Philippines.

After the success of He's Into Her, the DonBelle love team landed their first ever lead movie under Star Cinema directed by John Leo Garcia, romantic-comedy film Love Is Color Blind. The casts include their He's Into Her co-star Jeremiah Lisbo, as well as singer-actress Angelina Cruz, and TikTok superstar Esnyr Ranollo. It premiered through the streaming platforms KTX.ph and Smart's GigaPlay app. Shortly after coming to Netflix, the film ranked atop the streaming service's trending lists in the Philippines. Upcoming projects for the pair include a teleserye and a short film to be directed by Cathy Garcia-Molina, in collaboration with the Hong Kong Tourism Board.

He was also one of the artists to take part in ABS-CBN's 2021 Christmas Station ID, Andito Tayo Para Sa Isa't Isa along with Belle Mariano, Martin Nievera, Piolo Pascual, Gary Valenciano, Zsazsa Padilla, Erik Santos, KZ Tandingan, Kathryn Bernardo, Daniel Padilla, Sarah Geronimo, Sharon Cuneta, Vice Ganda, Regine Velasquez, Ogie Alcasid, Iñigo Pascual, Andrea Brillantes, Seth Fedelin, BGYO, and Darren Espanto.

In 2022, he was among the guests who appeared in Belle Mariano's first concert entitled Daylight: A Belle Mariano Digital Concert which was streamed via KTX.ph.

After starting taping and production in February, the most-awaited second season of He's Into Her officially premiered on April the same year. Upon release of the pilot episode, the series immediately became a trending topic in the Philippines.

Apart from this, the Movie Cut of the first season of He's Into Her premiered at the Drive-In Cinema One: A Drive-Thru Movie Experience, in partnership with Ayala Malls Vertis North and Vertis North Estate.

In August the same year, Star Magic toured in the United States as part of their 30th anniversary celebration. Pangilinan were among the stars who staged the shows. The artists first performed in the Newport Performing Arts Theater, Resorts World Manila, followed by the US shows in Kings Theater, Brooklyn, The Warfield, San Francisco, and in the Saban Theatre, Beverly Hills.

Filmography

Film

Television/Digital

Documentary

Music Videos

Concerts

Offline

Notes

Online

Discography

Extended Plays

Singles

Appearances

As a Featured Artist

Original Soundtracks

Station ID

Composition Credits

Awards and nominations

Movies and Television Awards

Creator Awards

Listicles

References

External links 
 
 
 

Filipino male film actors
Filipino male television actors
21st-century Filipino male actors
21st-century Filipino male singers
Filipino male models
ABS-CBN personalities
Star Music artists
1998 births
Living people
Donny